Statistics of the Yemeni League in the 2001-02 season.

Final table

External links
 

Yem
Yemeni League seasons
football
football